Ntombizodwa Sibanda is a Zimbabwean footballer who plays as a defender. She has been a member of the Zimbabwe women's national team.

Club career
Sibanda has played for Muton in Zimbabwe.

International career
Sibanda capped for Zimbabwe at senior level in 2010.

References

Living people
Zimbabwean women's footballers
Women's association football defenders
Zimbabwe women's international footballers
Year of birth missing (living people)